China Pacific Insurance (Group) Co., Ltd. (CPIC) known as Pacific Insurance, is a Chinese insurance company. It was established on the basis of the former China Pacific Insurance Corporation, which was founded in 1991 approved by the People's Bank of China. Its headquarters is in Shanghai.

CPIC Group is the second largest property insurance company (after People's Insurance Company of China) and the third largest life insurance company (after China Life Insurance and Ping An Insurance) in Mainland China. It provides integrated insurance services, including life insurance, property insurance and reinsurance, through its subsidiaries.

The company offers life and property insurance products and services through its subsidiaries, China Pacific Life Insurance Co., Ltd and China Pacific Property Insurance Co., Ltd., respectively. Through its subsidiary China Pacific Asset Management Co., Ltd, the company is also involved in the management, provision of consulting services relating to asset management and operation of insurance assets. The company's property insurance products include car insurance, insurance of family's properties, liability insurance, investment type insurance and accident insurance/injury insurance, while its life insurance products include endowment insurance, health insurance, juvenile assurance, insurance cover services and petty insurance.

Listings
Its A shares were listed on the Shanghai Stock Exchange on December 25, 2007, with IPO price 30 yuan per share. At the first trading day, its share price closed at 48.17 yuan, 61% more than its IPO price. It is planning to issue H shares in the Hong Kong Stock Exchange in near future. CPIC dropped below the IPO price of RMB¥30 on 26 March 2008 and closed at RMB¥27.98.

Its H shares were listed on the Hong Kong Stock Exchange on 23 December 2009 with IPO price of HK$28 per share.

Shareholders
:
 Central People's Government of China (State Council)
 State-owned Assets Supervision and Administration Commission (SASAC) of the State Council
 Baosteel Group (14.93%)
 The Ministry of Finance of the People's Republic of China (via China Tobacco)
 via Shanghai Tobacco Group (5.17%)
 via  (1.73%)
 China Securities Finance Co., Ltd. (2.36%)
Central Huijin Investment (1.22%)
 SASAC of the Shanghai Municipal Government (21.33%)
 Shenergy Group (13.52%)
 Shanghai State-owned Assets Operation Co., Ltd. (5.04%)
 Shanghai Jiushi (Group) Co., Ltd. (2.77%)
 general public (53.26%)

References

External links

Companies formerly in the Hang Seng China Enterprises Index
Insurance companies of China
H shares
Companies owned by the provincial government of China
Companies based in Shanghai
Financial services companies established in 1991
Chinese brands
China Tobacco
Baowu
Companies listed on the Shanghai Stock Exchange
Companies in the CSI 100 Index
Companies listed on the Hong Kong Stock Exchange
Companies listed on the London Stock Exchange
Chinese companies established in 1991